John Henry Iles (17 September 1871 – 29 May 1951) was an English entrepreneur, musician and cricketer. He played for Gloucestershire between 1890 and 1891.

In 1898 he acquired the British Bandsman magazine, and in 1900, he founded the National Brass Band Championships of Great Britain.

He was master of the Worshipful Company of Musicians from 1932-3, and inaugurated the John Henry Iles medal in 1947. He was awarded an OBE in 1947 for services to the brass band movement.

References 

1871 births
1951 deaths
English cricketers
Gloucestershire cricketers
Cricketers from Bristol
People from Birchington-on-Sea